is a Japanese politician who served as the Chairman of the National Public Safety Commission from July 2021 to October of that same year. He also served as Minister of State in Charge of Science and Technology Policy in Prime Minister Junichiro Koizumi's cabinet. Tanahashi is also a member of the House of Representatives for Gifu's 2nd district since 1996. 

He graduated from the University of Tokyo with a B.A. in private law.

External links
 http://www.kantei.go.jp/foreign/koizumidaijin/040927/18tanahashi_e.html

Government ministers of Japan
1963 births
Living people
Members of the House of Representatives (Japan)
University of Tokyo alumni
People from Ōgaki
Politicians from Gifu Prefecture
21st-century Japanese politicians